Greenfield Mills is an unincorporated community in Greenfield Township, LaGrange County, Indiana.

Geography

References

Unincorporated communities in LaGrange County, Indiana
Unincorporated communities in Indiana